Niekłończyca  (formerly ) is a village in the administrative district of Gmina Police, within Police County, West Pomeranian Voivodeship, in north-western Poland, close to the German border.

History 
First references to Niekłończyca (Königsfelde) came from 1750.  Niekłończyca, known as Königsfelde to its residents while part of Germany from 1815–1945, became part of Poland after the end of World War II and changed its name to the Polish Niekłończyca.

Below is a time line showing the history of the different administrations that this city has been included in.

Political-administrative membership:
 1815–1866: German Confederation, Kingdom of Prussia, Pomerania
 1866–1871: North German Confederation, Kingdom of Prussia, Pomerania
 1871–1918: German Empire, Kingdom of Prussia, Pomerania
 1919–1933: Weimar Republic, Free State of Prussia, Pomerania
 1933–1945: Nazi Germany, Pomerania
 1945–1946: Enclave of Police (the area reporting to the Red Army) 
 1946–1989: People's Republic of Poland, Szczecin Voivodeship
 1989–1998: Poland, Szczecin Voivodeship
 1999–present: Poland, West Pomeranian Voivodeship, Police County

Monuments 

 Baroque church (1787)
 Houses from the 19th and the 20th century

Demography 
The population of Niekłończyca:
 1863 – 385
 1939 – 625
 2001 – 350
 2006 – 390

Tourism 
 Bicycle trail (red  Trail "Puszcza Wkrzańska"-Szlak "Puszcza Wkrzańska") in an area of Niekłończyca in Wkrzanska Forest.

References

See also 

 Police, Poland
 Szczecin

Villages in Police County